Luc Carvounas (born 8 June 1971) is a French politician of the Socialist Party (PS) who served as a member of the National Assembly from 2017 until 2020, representing Val-de-Marne. He is currently mayor of Alfortville.

Political career
In the 2015 French regional elections in Île-de-France, Carvounas served as campaign director to the Socialist Party's candidate Claude Bartolone.

Carvounas was a candidate for the leadership of the Socialist Party at the Aubervilliers Congress in 2018.

From 2017 until 2020, Carvounas was a member of the National Assembly, where he served on the Defence Committee. In addition to his committee assignments, he was part of the French delegation to the Inter-Parliamentary Union (IPU).
In September 2020 his re-election as Mayor of Alfortville made him ineligible for the National Assembly due to the changed cumulation of mandates rule. His substitute, Sarah Taillebois, was ineligible due to appointment to the École nationale d'administration. A by-election was held 27 September 2020, which was won by Isabelle Santiago, also of the Socialist Party.

References

Page on the Senate Website

1971 births
Living people
French Senators of the Fifth Republic
Socialist Party (France) politicians
Gay politicians
LGBT mayors of places in France
Mayors of places in Île-de-France
People from Charenton-le-Pont
Deputies of the 15th National Assembly of the French Fifth Republic
French people of Greek descent
Senators of Val-de-Marne
LGBT legislators in France